Suša is a small village in the Municipality of Ig in southeastern Slovenia. Until 2007, the area was part of the settlement of Selnik. The village is part of the traditional region of Inner Carniola and is included in the Central Slovenia Statistical Region.

References

External links
Suša on Geopedia

Populated places in the Municipality of Ig
Populated places established in 2007
2007 establishments in Slovenia